Franco Valtorta (born 4 August 1956) is an Italian rower. He competed in the men's coxless pair event at the 1980 Summer Olympics.

References

1956 births
Living people
Italian male rowers
Olympic rowers of Italy
Rowers at the 1980 Summer Olympics
Rowers from Milan